NA-261 Mastung-cum-Surab-cum-Kalat is a constituency for the National Assembly of Pakistan.

Assembly Segments

Members of Parliament

2018-2022: NA-267 Mastung-cum-Shaheed Sikandarabad-cum-Kalat

Election 2002 

General elections were held on 10 Oct 2002. Maulana Abdul Ghafoor Haidri of Muttahida Majlis-e-Amal won by 21,559 votes.

Election 2008 

General elections were held on 18 Feb 2008. Ayatullah Durrani of PPP won by 19,355 votes.

Election 2013 

General elections were held on 11 May 2013. Sardar Kamal Khan Bangulzai of National Party won by 19,873 votes and became the member of National Assembly.

Election 2018

General elections were held on 25 July 2018.

See also
NA-260 Chagai-cum-Nushki-cum-Kharan-cum-Washuk
NA-262 Quetta-I

References

External links 
Election result's official website

NA-268